A nor'easter (also northeaster; see below), or an East Coast low is a synoptic-scale extratropical cyclone in the western North Atlantic Ocean. The name derives from the direction of the winds that blow from the northeast. The original use of the term in North America is associated with storms that affect the upper north Atlantic coast of the United States and the Atlantic Provinces of Canada.

Typically, such storms originate as a low-pressure area that forms within  of the shore between North Carolina and Massachusetts. The precipitation pattern is similar to that of other extratropical storms. Nor'easters are usually accompanied by heavy rain or snow, and can cause severe coastal flooding, coastal erosion, hurricane-force winds, or blizzard conditions. Nor'easters are usually most intense during winter in Northeastern United States and Atlantic Canada. They thrive on converging air masses—the cold polar air mass and the warmer air over the water—and are more severe in winter when the difference in temperature between these air masses is greater.

Nor'easters tend to develop most often and most powerfully between the months of November and March, although they can (much less commonly) develop during other parts of the year as well. The susceptible regions are generally impacted by nor'easters a few times each winter.

Etymology and usage

The term nor'easter came to American English by way of British English. Early recorded uses of the contraction nor (for north) in combinations such as nor'-east and nor-nor-west, as reported by the Oxford English Dictionary, date to the late 16th century, as in John Davis's 1594 The Seaman's Secrets: "Noreast by North raiseth a degree in sayling 24 leagues." The spelling appears, for instance, on a compass card published in 1607. Thus, the manner of pronouncing from memory the 32 points of the compass, known in maritime training as "boxing the compass", is described by Ansted with pronunciations "Nor'east (or west)," "Nor' Nor'-east (or west)," "Nor'east b' east (or west)," and so forth. According to the OED, the first recorded use of the term "nor'easter" occurs in 1836 in a translation of Aristophanes. The term "nor'easter" naturally developed from the historical spellings and pronunciations of the compass points and the direction of wind or sailing.

As noted in a January 2006 editorial by William Sisson, editor of Soundings magazine, use of "nor'easter" to describe the storm system is common along the U.S. East Coast. Yet it has been asserted by linguist Mark Liberman (see below) that "nor'easter" as a contraction for "northeaster" has no basis in regional New England dialect; the Boston accent would elide the "R": no'theastuh'''.  He describes nor'easter as a "fake" word. However, this view neglects the little-known etymology and the historical maritime usage described above.

19th-century Downeast mariners pronounced the compass point "north northeast" as "no'nuth-east", and so on. For decades, Edgar Comee, of Brunswick, Maine, waged a determined battle against use of the term "nor'easter" by the press, which usage he considered "a pretentious and altogether lamentable affectation" and "the odious, even loathsome, practice of landlubbers who would be seen as salty as the sea itself". His efforts, which included mailing hundreds of postcards, were profiled, just before his death in 2005 at the age of 88, in The New Yorker.

Despite the efforts of Comee and others, use of the term continues by the press. According to Boston Globe writer Jan Freeman, "from 1975 to 1980, journalists used the nor’easter spelling only once in five mentions of such storms; in the past year (2003), more than 80 percent of northeasters were spelled nor'easter".

University of Pennsylvania linguistics professor Mark Liberman has pointed out that while the Oxford English Dictionary cites examples dating back to 1837, these examples represent the contributions of a handful of non-New England poets and writers. Liberman posits that "nor'easter" may have originally been a literary affectation, akin to "e'en" for "even" and "th'only" for "the only", which is an indication in spelling that two syllables count for only one position in metered verse, with no implications for actual pronunciation.

However, despite these assertions, the term can be found in the writings of New Englanders, and was frequently used by the press in the 19th century.
 The Hartford Times reported on a storm striking New York in December 1839, and observed, "We Yankees had a share of this same "noreaster," but it was quite moderate in comparison to the one of the 15h inst."
 Thomas Bailey Aldrich, in his semi-autobiographical work The Story of a Bad Boy (1870), wrote "We had had several slight flurries of hail and snow before, but this was a regular nor'easter".
 In her story "In the Gray Goth" (1869) Elizabeth Stuart Phelps Ward wrote "...and there was snow in the sky now, setting in for a regular nor'easter".
 John H. Tice, in A new system of meteorology, designed for schools and private students (1878), wrote "During this battle, the dreaded, disagreeable and destructive Northeaster rages over the New England, the Middle States, and southward. No nor'easter ever occurs except when there is a high barometer headed off and driven down upon Nova Scotia and Lower Canada."

Usage existed into the 20th century in the form of:
 Current event description, as the Publication Committee of the New York Charity Organization Society wrote in Charities and the commons: a weekly journal of philanthropy and social advance, Volume 19 (1908): "In spite of a heavy "nor'easter," the worst that has visited the New England coast in years, the hall was crowded."
 Historical reference, as used by Mary Rogers Bangs in Old Cape Cod (1917): "In December of 1778, the Federal brig General Arnold, Magee master and twelve Barnstable men among the crew, drove ashore on the Plymouth flats during a furious nor'easter, the "Magee storm" that mariners, for years after, used as a date to reckon from."
 A "common contraction for "northeaster"", as listed in Ralph E. Huschke's Glossary of Meteorology'' (1959).

The Pacific Northwest is also affected by a similar class of powerful extratropical cyclones, known as Pacific Northwest windstorms. While the storms on the East Coast are named "nor'easters", the Pacific Northwest windstorms are not called "nor'westers" because the cyclones' primary winds can blow from any direction, while the primary winds in nor'easters usually blow from the northeast.

Geography and formation characteristics

Formation
Nor'easters develop in response to the sharp contrast in the warm Gulf Stream ocean current coming up from the tropical Atlantic and the cold air masses coming down from Canada. Very cold and dry air rushing southward and meeting up with the warm Gulf stream current, which is typically  near  even mid-winter, often causes low-pressure areas to develop and intensify.

In the upper atmosphere, the strong winds of the jet stream remove and replace rising air from the Atlantic more rapidly than the Atlantic air is replaced at lower levels; this and the Coriolis force help develop a strong storm. The storm tracks northeast along the East Coast, normally from North Carolina to Long Island, then moves toward the area east of Cape Cod. Counterclockwise winds around the low-pressure system blow the moist air over land. The relatively warm, moist air meets cold air coming southward from Canada. The low increases the surrounding pressure difference, which causes the very different air masses to collide at a faster speed. When the difference in temperature of the air masses is larger, so is the storm's instability, turbulence, and thus severity.

The nor'easters taking the East Coast track usually indicates the presence of a high-pressure area in the vicinity of Nova Scotia. Sometimes a nor'easter will move slightly inland and bring rain to the cities on the coastal plain (New York City, Philadelphia, Baltimore, etc.) and snow in New England (Boston northward). On occasion, nor'easters can pull cold air as far south as Virginia or North Carolina, bringing wet snow inland in those areas for a brief time. Such a storm will rapidly intensify, tracking northward and following the topography of the East Coast, sometimes continuing to grow stronger during its entire existence. A nor'easter usually reaches its peak intensity while off the Canadian coast. The storm then reaches Arctic areas, and can reach intensities equal to that of a weak hurricane. It then meanders throughout the North Atlantic and can last for several weeks.

Meteorologists use the Miller Classification to determine the track and severity of a nor'easter. The technique is named after J.E. Miller, who created the system in 1946. The Miller Classification classified storms into two categories: Type A and Type B. Type A storms form in the Gulf of Mexico or along the coast of Georgia or South Carolina, and cause heavy snow mainly to parts of the Mid-Atlantic, New England, and Atlantic Canada. Type B storms form from a parent low-pressure system over the Ohio Valley, which then undergoes a center reformation onto the Gulf Stream. These storms can bring a swath of wintry precipitation from the Great Plains and the Ohio River Valley to the Southeastern United States and New England.

Characteristics
Nor'easters are usually formed by an area of vorticity associated with an upper-level disturbance or from a kink in a frontal surface that causes a surface low-pressure area to develop. Such storms are very often formed from the merging of several weaker storms, a "parent storm", and a polar jet stream mixing with the tropical jet stream.

Temperatures usually fall significantly due to the presence of the cooler air from winds that typically come from a northeasterly direction. During a single storm, the precipitation can range from a torrential downpour to a fine mist. All precipitation types can occur in a nor'easter. High wind gusts, which can reach hurricane strength, are also associated with a nor'easter. On very rare occasions, such as in the nor'easter in 1978, North American blizzard of 2006, Early February 2013 North American blizzard, and January 2018 North American blizzard, the center of the storm can take on the circular shape more typical of a hurricane and have a small "dry slot" near the center, which can be mistaken for an eye, although it is not an eye.

Difference from tropical cyclones
Often, people mistake nor'easters for tropical cyclones and do not differentiate between the two weather systems. Nor'easters differ from tropical cyclones in that nor'easters are cold-core low-pressure systems, meaning that they thrive on drastic changes in temperature of Canadian air and warm Atlantic waters.  Tropical cyclones are warm-core low-pressure systems, which means they thrive on purely warm temperatures. However, in rare cases, such as the 1991 Perfect Storm, a small tropical cyclone can develop inside the warm seclusion of an intense nor'easter if the sea surface temperatures are sufficiently warm. Nor'easters can rarely also turn into tropical or subtropical cyclones, such as 2021's Tropical Storm Wanda.

Difference from other extratropical storms
A nor'easter is a strong extratropical cyclone, often experiencing explosive cyclogenesis. While this formation occurs in many places around the world, nor'easters are unique for their combination of northeast winds and moisture content of the swirling clouds. Nearly similar conditions sometimes occur during winter in the Pacific Northeast (northern Japan and northwards) with winds from NNW. In Europe, similar weather systems with such severity are hardly possible; the moisture content of the clouds is usually not high enough to cause flooding or heavy snow, although northeasterly winds can be strong.

Geography
The eastern United States, from North Carolina to Maine, and Eastern Canada can experience nor'easters, though most often they affect the areas in the Northeastern United States. The effects of a nor'easter sometimes bring high surf and strong winds as far south as coastal South Carolina. Nor'easters cause a significant amount of beach erosion in these areas, as well as flooding in the associated low-lying areas.

Biologists at the Woods Hole Oceanographic Institution on Cape Cod have determined nor'easters are an environmental factor for red tides on the Atlantic coast.

List of notable nor'easters

A list of nor'easters with short description about the events.

See also

 Black nor'easter
 Alberta clipper
 Cold-core low
 Panhandle hook
 Sudestada
 Winter storm
 Pacific Northwest windstorm
 Aleutian low
 European windstorm
 Polar vortex
 Cold wave

References

External links

 Blizzard Video: Dec 9, 2005 (duration: 9m59sec)
 Archived issues of NOR'EASTER (Magazine of the Northeast Sea Grant Programs), published until 1999.
 Duxbury, Massachusetts April 2007 Nor'easter photos

 
Extratropical cyclones
Weather events in the United States
Weather events in Canada

Culture of New England
Northeastern United States